Samuel Gallacher (born 23 December 1904) was a Scottish professional footballer who played as a centre half.

Career
Born in Annbank, Gallacher played for Larkfield Juniors and Cadzow St. Anne's in his native Scotland, before moving to England to join Bradford City in May 1924. For Bradford City he made 40 appearances in the Football League, scoring 2 goals. He left the club in August 1927 to join Crystal Palace.

He later played for Lincoln City, making 13 appearances in the Football League as well as one FA Cup appearance for them, before joining York City.

References

Bibliography

1904 births
Year of death missing
Scottish footballers
Bradford City A.F.C. players
Crystal Palace F.C. players
Lincoln City F.C. players
York City F.C. players
English Football League players
Association football defenders